Jean-Raymond Couiteas de Faucamberge (né Couiteas; 24 September 1901 – 24 December 1963) was a tennis player from France. He competed in the International Lawn Tennis Challenge in 1922 and 1924. He later developed a relationship with the American heiress Gertrude Sanford Legendre.

ILTF finals

Doubles (1)

References

External links
 
 
 

1901 births
1963 deaths
French male tennis players